Monshipour is an Iranian surname. Notable people with the surname include:

Mahyar Monshipour (born 1975), Iranian-born French boxer
Mahmood Monshipouri (born 1952), Iranian-born American scholar, author, educator
Tina Monshipour Foster, Iranian-American lawyer

Persian-language surnames